Aleksi Malinen (born 26 May 2003) is a Finnish professional ice hockey defenseman who plays for JYP Jyväskylä in Liiga. He was selected 189th overall in the 2021 NHL Entry Draft by the New York Islanders.

Playing career
Malinen played 30 games in Liiga with JYP during the 2020–21 season. He would subsequently be selected 189th overall in the 2021 NHL Entry Draft by the New York Islanders.

Career statistics

Regular season and playoffs

International

References

External links
 

2003 births
Living people
Finnish ice hockey defencemen
JYP Jyväskylä players
KeuPa HT players
New York Islanders draft picks
People from Tuusula
Sportspeople from Uusimaa